Charlie Owens (born 7 December 1997) is a British professional footballer who plays as a midfielder for Queens Park Rangers, .

Club career

Queens Park Rangers
On 28 August 2018 Owens was named as a substitute in the second round of the 2018–19 EFL Cup against Bristol Rovers. He replaced Grant Hall in the 65th minute to make his first team and professional debut. In August 2019 Owens signed a new two-year deal under manager Mark Warburton.

Wycombe Wanderers (loan)
On 31 January 2019, Owens joined League One side Wycombe Wanderers on a loan deal, lasting until the end of the 2018/19 season. On 12 March 2019 Owens was named as a substitute against  Accrington Stanley, he replaced Curtis Thompson in the 87th minute to make his EFL debut.

Career statistics

References

1997 births
Living people
English footballers
Northern Ireland youth international footballers
Northern Ireland under-21 international footballers
Association football midfielders
Queens Park Rangers F.C. players
Wycombe Wanderers F.C. players
English Football League players